Ronald Malcolm Climie (born March 4, 1950) is a Canadian former professional ice hockey player who played 249 games in the World Hockey Association (WHA).  He played for the Ottawa Nationals in the WHA's inaugural (1972–73) season, then the Edmonton Oilers and New England Whalers. He also played in the first two WHA all star games. Climie was the Oilers' team-scoring champion in their second (1973–74) season.

Career statistics

References

1950 births
Living people
Canadian ice hockey left wingers
Denver Spurs (WHL) players
Edmonton Oilers (WHA) players
Kansas City Blues players
New England Whalers players
Ottawa Nationals players
Rhode Island Reds players
St. Louis Blues draft picks